Jesús Alexander Valdez Mejia (Cacao) (born November 2, 1984) is a Dominican professional baseball outfielder for El Águila de Veracruz of the Mexican League. He played in the minor league organizations of the Chicago Cubs and Washington Nationals previously. Valdez was selected to the roster for the Colombia national baseball team at the 2017 World Baseball Classic.

Career
Valdez began his career with the Chicago Cubs organization in 2003, and reached as high as the advanced-A Daytona Cubs when he became a free agent after the 2007 season. He joined the Washington Nationals organization in 2008. On November 2, 2011, Valdez elected free agency, but re-signed with the Nationals on November 7. Valdez reached Triple-A with the Syracuse Chiefs but never made the major leagues as he elected free agency on November 2, 2012. On March 27, 2015, Valdez was assigned to the Leones de Yucatán of the Mexican League. On July 4, 2017, Valdez was traded to the Vaqueros Unión Laguna. On October 20, 2017, Valdez was traded back to the Leones, who released Valdez on July 3, 2018. On April 4, 2019, Valdez signed with the Toros de Tijuana. Valdez did not play in a game in 2020 due to the cancellation of the Mexican League season because of the COVID-19 pandemic. On February 12, 2021, Valdez's rights were secured by El Águila de Veracruz of the Mexican League, and he later signed with them for the 2021 season.

References

External links

1984 births
Living people
Arizona League Cubs players
Boise Hawks players
Charros de Jalisco players
Daytona Cubs players
Dominican Republic expatriate baseball players in Mexico
Dominican Republic expatriate baseball players in the United States
Dominican Republic people of Colombian descent
El Águila de Veracruz players
Gulf Coast Nationals players
Hagerstown Suns players
Harrisburg Senators players
Leones del Escogido players
Leones de Yucatán players
Mexican League baseball left fielders
Mexican League baseball right fielders
Navegantes del Magallanes players
People from San Cristóbal, Dominican Republic
Peoria Chiefs players
Potomac Nationals players
Rio Grande Valley WhiteWings players
Syracuse Chiefs players
Toros de Tijuana players
Vaqueros Unión Laguna players
Vermont Lake Monsters players
2017 World Baseball Classic players
Dominican Republic expatriate baseball players in Venezuela